|}

The Mercedes-Benz Novice Hurdle is a Grade 3 National Hunt hurdle race in Ireland which is open to horses aged four years or older. 
It is run at Clonmel over a distance of 3 miles (4,828 metres), and during its running there are 14 flights of hurdles to be jumped. It is scheduled to take place each year in February.

The race was first run in 2003, became a Listed race in 2008 and was awarded Grade 3 status in 2013.

Records
Leading jockey  (4 wins):
 Ruby Walsh – Cooldine (2008), Inish Island (2013), Arkwrisht (2016), Allaho (2019)

Leading trainer  (7 wins):
 Willie Mullins – Cooldine (2008), Bishopsfurze (2011), Inish Island (2013), Don Poli (2014), Roi Des Francs (2015), Arkwrisht (2016), Allaho (2019)

Winners

See also 
 Horseracing in Ireland
 List of Irish National Hunt races

References
Racing Post:

National Hunt hurdle races
National Hunt races in Ireland
Recurring sporting events established in 2003
Clonmel Racecourse
2003 establishments in Ireland